ŽNK Dinamo-Maksimir was a Croatian women's football club based in Zagreb. The club was founded as ŽNK Maksimir in 1937. In 2016, the club merged with new entity named ŽNK Dinamo Zagreb.

Honours
Croatian First Division:
Winners (4): 1992, 2004, 2005, 2006
Runners-up (8): 1996, 1997, 1998, 2000, 2001, 2007, 2008, 2012
Croatian Cup:
Winners (6): 1992, 1993, 2003, 2004, 2005, 2006
Runners-up (3): 2008, 2012, 2013
Yugoslav First Division:
Winners (3): 1981, 1982, 1991
Yugoslav Cup:
Winners (4): 1980, 1982, 1987, 1990

Recent seasons

European record

Summary

By season

External links
ŽNK Dinamo-Maksimir webpage at the NK Dinamo Zagreb website 

Women's football clubs in Croatia
Association football clubs established in 1937
Football clubs in Zagreb
1937 establishments in Croatia
Maksimir